Alan Dale George from the University of Florida, Gainesville, FL was named Fellow of the Institute of Electrical and Electronics Engineers (IEEE) in 2013 for contributions to reconfigurable and high-performance computing.

References

Fellow Members of the IEEE
Living people
University of Florida faculty
21st-century American engineers
Year of birth missing (living people)
Place of birth missing (living people)
American electrical engineers